Black Hand Side is a song by the American hip-hop artist, Queen Latifah, released as a single in 1994, from her album, Black Reign. The song was written by Queen Latifah and Sidney "S.I.D." Reynolds, and samples "Hello It's Me" by The Isley Brothers. The music video was directed by the critically acclaimed F. Gary Gray, who also directed the music videos for Ice Cube's "It Was a Good Day" and TLC's "Waterfalls".

Formats and track listings
American CD/Cassette Maxi Single/12 Inch Vinyl Single
 Black Hand Side - Al's Remix (Remixed by Al "Baby Jesus" Eaton)
 Black Hand Side - Jay's Lab Groove (Remixed by Jay Wright)
 Black Hand Side - A cappella
 Weekend Love (LP Version) (Featuring Tony Rebel)
 Weekend Love (Instrumental)

Lyric Change
In the LP version of the song, Latifah says "Black Reign 1993, I'd like to welcome you to this album." The album was released in 1993. Black Hand Side was released as a single in 1994 so the lyric was changed to "Black Reign 1994, I'd like to welcome you to this album." for the video and single.

1994 singles
Music videos directed by F. Gary Gray
Queen Latifah songs
Motown singles
1993 songs
Songs written by Queen Latifah